Village Level Operation and Maintenance (VLOM) is an unofficial classification given to handpumps used in developing countries that require minimal maintenance or that can be done "at the village level."  Not all maintenance and repair needs to be done by the villagers for a pump to be classed as a VLOM pump. VLOMM, or Village Level Operation and Management of Maintenance is often used synonymously.  This addition emphasizes the role of users as the managers of maintenance able choose to use someone from outside the village to assist with more complicated repairs.

History 
During the first UN decade on water boreholes, hand-dug wells and tubewells were constructed and water pumps were provided to developing countries by various NGOs. Unfortunately this top down approach led to the installation of pumps, notable the India Mark II, that were difficult to  maintain. VLOM pumps were designed to allow remote villages to maintain pumps themselves as part of a larger strategy to reduce the dependency of villages on government and donor agencies and provide more sustainable access to drinking water.

Common VLOM Pumps

Implementation 
The concept of Village Level Operation and Maintenance Management in relation to communal handpumps has gained wide acceptance in the rural water sector. Project and pump designs based on VLOM principles are now commonplace. However, implementation of handpump programs in accordance with VLOM criteria have been only partially successful and the VLOM approach to maintenance has been very difficult to realize in the field, especially in Africa.

It was assumed that the private sector would take care of the distribution of spare parts, but most parts had to be imported and were difficult to get. Low profit margins on spares did not encourage the private sector to take up the role of importing and distributing spare parts. As a result, VLOM technology is increasingly seen as one amongst many components needed for the sustainable provision of village water supplies.

Difficulties with the introduction of VLOM have called into question a number of inherent assumptions in the concept relating to the user community, the supporting environment and technology choice. Of particular importance is the assumption that introducing and supporting VLOM is an easier task for government than running a centralized maintenance service.

VLOM has undoubtedly brought the answer to sustainability a little closer; however, the goal of easy maintenance remains elusive. Perhaps the greatest lesson is that there are currently no ‘off-the-shelf’ solutions which can bypass the need for effective government institutional community water point support. Wherever this problem is unresolved, and where there are no NGOs or other agencies to fill the gap, sustainability will always be in doubt.

Recently there have been attempts to involve the private sector, not only in selling spares and handpump repairs, but also in local pump sales and installation. This is called the "BlueZone" approach where a handpump dealer has its own region to take care of. Due to economics of scale, this would raise a more interesting business case and keep the handpump dealer interested to maintain this service while the communities have a reliable source of water with a local back-up. Unfortunately there are no simple one-fit-all solution on the horizon for sub-Saharan Africa, which experiences these problems most acutely.

References

External links

VLOM pumps
Information on VLOM/ rope pumps

Pumps
Water supply
Appropriate technology